Les Misérables, colloquially known as Les Mis or Les Miz, is a sung-through musical and an adaptation of Victor Hugo's 1862 novel of the same name, by Claude-Michel Schönberg (music), Alain Boublil, Jean-Marc Natel (original French lyrics) and Herbert Kretzmer (English lyrics). The original French musical premiered in Paris in 1980 with direction by Robert Hossein. Its English-language adaptation by producer Cameron Mackintosh has been running in London since October 1985, making it the longest-running musical in the West End and the second longest-running musical in the world after the original Off-Broadway run of The Fantasticks.

Set in early 19th-century France, Les Misérables is the story of Jean Valjean, a French peasant, and his desire for redemption, released in 1815 after serving nineteen years in jail for stealing a loaf of bread for his sister's starving child. Valjean decides to break his parole and start his life anew after a bishop inspires him with a tremendous act of mercy, but a police inspector named Javert refuses to let him escape justice and pursues him for most of the play. Along the way, Valjean and a slew of characters are swept into a revolutionary period in France, where a group of young idealists attempt to overthrow the government at a street barricade in Paris.

Background
Les Misérables was originally released as a French-language concept album, and the first musical-stage adaptation of Les Misérables was presented at the Palais des Sports in 1980.

In 1983, about six months after producer Cameron Mackintosh had opened Cats on Broadway, he received a copy of the French concept album from director Peter Farago. Farago had been impressed by the work and asked Mackintosh to produce an English-language version of the show. Initially reluctant, Mackintosh eventually agreed. Mackintosh, in conjunction with the Royal Shakespeare Company, assembled a production team to adapt the French musical for a British audience. After two years in development, the English-language version opened in London on 8 October 1985, by the Royal Shakespeare Company at the Barbican Centre, then the London home of the RSC. The success of the West End musical led to a Broadway production.

Critical reception and milestones

Critical reviews for Les Misérables were initially negative. At the opening of the London production, The Sunday Telegraphs Francis King described the musical as "a lurid Victorian melodrama produced with Victorian lavishness" and Michael Ratcliffe of The Observer considered the show "a witless and synthetic entertainment", while literary scholars condemned the project for converting classic literature into a musical. Public opinion differed: the box office received record orders. The three-month engagement sold out, and reviews improved. The original London production ran from October 1985 to July 2019, playing over 13,000 performances and making it the second longest-running musical in the world after The Fantasticks, the second longest-running West End show after The Mousetrap, and the longest-running musical in the West End. On 3 October 2010, the show celebrated its 25th anniversary with three productions running in London: the original production at the Queen's Theatre; the 25th Anniversary touring production at the Barbican Centre; and the 25th Anniversary concert at London's O2 Arena.

The Broadway production opened 12 March 1987 and ran until 18 May 2003, closing after 6,680 performances. At the time of its closing, it was the second-longest-running musical in Broadway history. As of 2022, it remains the sixth longest-running Broadway show. The show was nominated for 12 Tony Awards, of which it won eight, including Best Musical and Best Original Score.

Subsequently, numerous tours and international and regional productions have been staged, as well as concert and broadcast productions. Several recordings have also been made. A Broadway revival opened in 2006 at the Broadhurst Theatre and closed in 2008, and a second Broadway revival opened in 2014 at the Imperial Theatre and closed in September 2016. The show was placed first in a BBC Radio 2 listener poll of Britain's "Number One Essential Musicals" in 2005, receiving more than forty percent of the votes. A film version directed by Tom Hooper was released at the end of 2012 to generally positive reviews as well as numerous awards.

Emblem

The musical's emblem is a picture of the waif Cosette sweeping the Thénardiers' inn (which occurs in the musical during "Castle on a Cloud"). It is usually cropped to a head-and-shoulders portrait, superimposed on the French flag. The image is based on an etching by Gustave Brion, which in turn was based on the drawing by Émile Bayard. Bayard's drawing appeared in several of the novel's earliest French-language editions.

Synopsis

Prologue
In 1815 in France, a chain gang of prisoners work at hard labor ("Prologue: Work Song"). After 19 years in prison, Jean Valjean, "Prisoner 24601," is released on parole by the prison guard Javert. By law, Valjean must display a yellow ticket of leave, which identifies him as an ex-convict ("On Parole").

As a convict, Valjean is shunned wherever he goes and cannot find regular work with decent wages or lodging. Only the Bishop of Digne offers him food and shelter. Discontented, Valjean steals the Bishop's silver. He is captured by the police, but rather than turn him in, the Bishop tells the police that the silver was a gift, also giving Valjean a pair of silver candlesticks. The Bishop tells Valjean that he must use silver to become an honest man. ("Valjean Arrested, Valjean Forgiven"). Humbled by the Bishop's kindness, Valjean resolves to redeem himself ("Valjean's Soliloquy (What Have I Done?)") and tears up his yellow ticket, breaking his parole.

Act I
Eight years later, in 1823, Jean Valjean assumed a new identity as Monsieur Madeleine, a wealthy factory owner and mayor of Montreuil-sur-Mer. Fantine is a single mother working in his factory, trying to support her daughter Cosette, who is being raised by an innkeeper and his wife while Fantine labors in the city. The factory foreman lusts after Fantine, and when she rejects his advances, he takes it out on the other workers, who resent her for it. One day, a coworker steals a letter about Cosette from Fantine, revealing to the other workers that Fantine has a child. A fight breaks out, and the foreman and other workers use the incident as a pretense to fire Fantine ("At the End of the Day"). Fantine reflects on her broken dreams and about Cosette's father, who abandoned them both ("I Dreamed a Dream"). Desperate for money, she sells her locket and hair, finally becoming a prostitute ("Lovely Ladies") and attracting local sailors. When she fights back against an abusive customer named Bamatabois; Javert, now a police inspector stationed in Montreuil-sur-Mer, arrives to arrest her. Valjean passes by the scene and pities Fantine when he realizes she once worked for him. He orders Javert to release her, and Valjean takes her to a hospital ("Fantine's Arrest").

Soon afterward, Valjean rescues a man who is pinned by a runaway cart ("The Runaway Cart"). Javert, who has pursued the fugitive Valjean all these years, witnesses the incident. He becomes suspicious, remembering the incredible strength Valjean displayed in the work camp. However, it turns out a man who looks like Valjean has been arrested and is about to go to trial for breaking parole. The real Valjean realizes that this case of mistaken identity could free him forever, but he is not willing to see an innocent man go to prison in his place. He confesses his identity to the court ("Who Am I? (The Trial)"). At the hospital, a delirious Fantine dreams of Cosette. Valjean promises to find Cosette and protect her ("Come to Me (Fantine's Death)"). Relieved, Fantine succumbs to her illness and dies. Javert arrives to take Valjean back into custody, but Valjean asks Javert for time to fetch Cosette. Javert refuses, insisting that a criminal like Valjean can never change for the better. They struggle, but Valjean overpowers Javert and escapes ("The Confrontation").

In Montfermeil, the duplicitous innkeepers, the Thénardiers, use Cosette as a servant and treat her cruelly while extorting money from Fantine to indulge their own daughter Éponine. Cosette dreams of a life with a mother where she is not forced to work and is treated lovingly ("Castle on a Cloud"). The Thénardiers cheat on their customers, stealing their possessions and setting high prices for low-quality services while living a life of criminal depravity ("Master of the House"). Valjean meets Cosette while she's on an errand drawing water, and offers the Thénardiers payment to adopt her ("The Bargain"). The Thénardiers feign concern for Cosette, claiming that they love her like a daughter and that she is in fragile health. Valjean negotiates with the Thénadiers, for whom he pays 1,500 francs in the end. Valjean and Cosette leave for Paris ("The Waltz of Treachery").

Nine years later, in 1832, Paris is in upheaval because of the impending death of General Lamarque, the only man in the government who shows mercy to the poor. Among those mingling in the streets are the student revolutionaries Marius Pontmercy and Enjolras, who contemplate the effect Lamarque's death will have on the poor and desperate in Paris. The Thénardiers have since lost their inn and now run a street gang that consists of thugs Brujon, Babet, Claquesous, and Montparnasse. The Thénardiers' daughter Éponine is also now grown and has fallen in love with her oblivious friend Marius, as well as the streetwise young urchin Gavroche who knows everything that happens in the slums ("Look Down"). The Thénardiers prepare to con some charitable visitors, who turn out to be Valjean and a fully-grown Cosette. While the gang confounds her father, Cosette runs into Marius, and the pair fall in love. Thénardier recognizes Valjean, but Javert intervenes before they can finish the robbery ("The Robbery"). Valjean and Cosette escape, and only later does Javert suspect who they were. Javert makes a vow that he will find Valjean and recapture him ("Stars"). Meanwhile, Marius persuades Éponine to help him find Cosette ("Éponine's Errand").

At a small café, Enjolras exhorts a group of idealistic students to prepare for revolution. Marius interrupts the serious atmosphere by fantasizing about his new-found love, much to the amusement of his compatriots ("The ABC Café/Red and Black"). When Gavroche brings the news of General Lamarque's death, the students realize that they can use the public's dismay to incite their revolution and that their time has come ("Do You Hear the People Sing?"). At Valjean's house, Cosette thinks about her meeting with Marius. She confronts Valjean about the secrets he keeps about his and her own past ("Rue Plumet/In My Life"). Éponine leads Marius to Cosette's garden. He and Cosette meet again and confess their mutual love, while a heartbroken Éponine watches them through the garden gate and laments that Marius has fallen in love with another ("A Heart Full of Love"). Thénardier and his gang arrive, intending to rob Valjean's house, but Éponine stops them by screaming a warning ("The Attack on Rue Plumet"). The scream alerts Valjean, who believes that the intruder was Javert. He tells Cosette that it's time once again for them to go on the run, and starts planning for them to flee France altogether.

On the eve of the 1832 Paris Uprising, Valjean prepares to go into exile. Cosette and Marius part in despair, while Enjolras encourages all of Paris to join the revolution. Éponine acknowledges despairingly that Marius will never love her, and Marius is conflicted about whether to follow Cosette or join the uprising. Meanwhile, Javert reveals his plans to spy on the students and the Thénardiers scheme to profit off the coming violence. Marius decides to stand with his friends, and all anticipate what the dawn will bring ("One Day More").

Act II

The students build a barricade to serve as their rally point. Javert, who is disguised as a rebel, volunteers to "spy" on the government troops. Marius discovers that Éponine has disguised herself as a boy to join the rebels. Wanting to keep his best friend safe from the impending violence, he sends her to deliver a farewell letter to Cosette. ("Building the Barricade (Upon These Stones)") Valjean intercepts the letter and learns about Marius and Cosette's romance. Éponine walks the streets of Paris alone, imagining that Marius is there with her, but laments that her love for Marius will never be reciprocated ("On My Own").

The French army arrives at the barricade and demands that the students surrender ("At the Barricade"). However, Javert tells the students that the government will not attack that night ("Javert's Arrival"). Gavroche recognizes him and quickly exposes him as a spy, and the students detain him ("Little People"). The students plan to spark a general uprising with their act of defiance, hoping that all the people of Paris will side with them and overwhelm the army. Éponine returns to find Marius but is shot by the soldiers who were crossing the barricade. As Marius holds her, she assures him that she feels no pain and reveals her love for him before dying in his arms ("A Little Fall of Rain (Eponine's Death)"). The students mourn this first loss of life at the barricades and resolve to fight in her name. Enjolras attempts to comfort Marius, who is devastated and heartbroken over the death of his best friend. Valjean arrives at the barricade, crossing the government lines disguised as a soldier ("Night of Anguish"). He hopes that he can protect Marius in the coming battle for Cosette's sake. The rebels are suspicious of him at first, but accept him after he saves Enjolras from a soldier. Valjean asks Enjolras to allow him to be the executioner of the imprisoned Javert, which Enjolras grants. But as soon as Valjean and Javert are alone, Valjean frees him. Javert warns Valjean that he will not give up his pursuit and rejects what he perceives as a bargain for Valjean's freedom. Valjean says there are no conditions to his release, and holds no grudges toward Javert for doing his duty ("The First Attack").

The students settle down for the night and express anxiety about the battle to come. Enjolras tells the other students to stay awake for a surprise attack, but he tells Marius to get some sleep because of the latter's devastation over losing Éponine. Grantaire gets angry and asks the students if they fear dying, and Marius wonders if Cosette will remember him if he does ("Drink with Me"). Valjean prays to God to protect Marius, even if the cost for his safety requires Valjean's own life ("Bring Him Home"). As dawn approaches, Enjolras realizes that the people of Paris have not risen up with them, but resolves to fight on in spite of the impossible odds ("Dawn of Anguish"). Their resolve is further increased when the army kills Gavroche, who snuck out to collect ammunition from bodies on the other side of the barricade ("The Second Attack (Death of Gavroche)"). The army gives a final warning, but the rebels fight to the last man. Everyone at the barricade is killed except Valjean and a gravely wounded Marius, who both escape into the sewers ("The Final Battle"). Javert returns to the barricade to search for Valjean, and he finds the open sewer grating.

Valjean carries Marius through the sewers but collapses from exhaustion. Thénardier, who has been looting bodies, comes upon them and extracts a ring from the unconscious Marius. He flees when Valjean regains consciousness ("Dog Eats Dog"). When Valjean carries Marius to the sewer's exit, he finds Javert waiting for him. Valjean begs Javert for one hour to bring Marius to a doctor, and Javert reluctantly agrees. Javert finds himself unable to reconcile Valjean's merciful acts with his perception of Valjean as an irredeemable criminal. Finding himself torn between his beliefs about God and his desire to adhere to the law, Javert commits suicide by throwing himself into the Seine ("Javert's Suicide").

In the wake of the failed revolution, many women mourn the deaths of the students ("Turning"). Marius, wounded but alive, despairs at the deaths of his friends and perceives that their sacrifice was for nothing ("Empty Chairs at Empty Tables"). As he wonders who saved his own life, Cosette confronts him and they reaffirm their blossoming romance. Valjean realizes that Cosette will not need him as a caretaker once she is married and gives them his blessing ("Every Day"). Valjean confesses to Marius that he is an escaped convict and must go away because his presence endangers Cosette ("Valjean's Confession"). He makes Marius promise never to tell Cosette. A few months later, Marius and Cosette marry ("Wedding Chorale"). The Thénardiers gatecrash the reception disguised as nobility and attempt to blackmail Marius, telling him that Valjean is a murderer and that Thénardier saw him carrying a corpse in the sewers. When Thénardier shows him the ring he stole as proof, Marius realizes that it was Valjean who saved his life. The newlyweds leave to find Valjean (in some productions, Marius pauses to give Thénardier a punch in the face). The Thénardiers are not discouraged, instead gloating that their craven practicality has saved their lives time and time again ("Beggars at the Feast").

At a convent, Valjean awaits his death, having nothing left to live for. The spirit of Fantine appears to him and tells him that he has been forgiven and will soon be with God. Cosette and Marius arrive to find Valjean near death. Valjean thanks God for letting him live long enough to see Cosette again, and Marius thanks him for saving his life ("Valjean's Death"). Valjean gives Cosette a letter confessing his troubled past and the truth about her mother. As he dies, the spirits of Fantine and Éponine guide him to Heaven reminding him that "to love another person is to see the face of God". They are joined by the spirits of those who died at the barricades, all of whom sing of the coming of a better world ("Do You Hear The People Sing? (Reprise)").

Musical numbers

Instrumentation
The standard orchestration for the 2009 U.K. tour of Les Misérables consisted of:

 Bass		
 Cello		
 Horn 1		
 Horn 2		
 Keyboard 1		
 Keyboard 2		
 Percussion		
 Reed 1 (Alto Flute, Alto Recorder, Flute, Piccolo) 
 Reed 2 (Cor Anglais, Oboe)	
 Reed 3 (B♭ Clarinet, Bass Clarinet, E♭ Clarinet, Tenor Recorder)	
 Trombone/ Tuba	
 Trumpet/ Flugelhorn		
 Viola		
 Violin

Characters

Casts

Original casts

Notable replacements

West End (1985– )
Jean Valjean: Alfie Boe, Simon Bowman, Killian Donnelly, Dudu Fisher, Simon Gleeson, Ramin Karimloo, Peter Karrie, Peter Lockyer, John Owen-Jones, Jon Robyns, Stig Rossen, Drew Sarich, Martin Smith, Dave Willetts, Antony Hansen (u/s), Bradley Jaden (u/s), Glyn Kerslake (u/s)
Javert: Michael Ball, David Burt, Earl Carpenter, Clive Carter, Peter Corry, Hadley Fraser, Bradley Jaden, Norm Lewis, Michael McCarthy, Tam Mutu, Jérôme Pradon, Philip Quast, Hayden Tee, David Thaxton, Killian Donnelly (u/s)
Fantine: Madalena Alberto, Joanna Ampil, Gunilla Backman, Sierra Boggess, Allyson Brown, Carmen Cusack, Kerry Ellis, Carrie Hope Fletcher, Rachelle Ann Go, Carola Häggkvist, Ruthie Henshall, Na-Young Jeon, Lucie Jones, Kathleen Rowe McAllen, Siobhán McCarthy, Claire Moore, Silvie Paladino, Jenna Russell, Celinde Schoenmaker, Caroline Sheen, Carley Stenson, Rebecca Storm, Caroline Quentin (u/s), Dianne Pilkington (u/s)
Thénardier: Martin Ball, Barry James, Chris Langham, Matt Lucas, Hilton McRae, Peter Polycarpou, Stephen Tate
Madame Thénardier: Rosemary Ashe, Tracie Bennett, Vicky Entwistle, Josefina Gabrielle, Jenny Galloway, Linzi Hateley, Claire Machin, Claire Moore, Louise Plowright, Jodie Prenger, Gay Soper, Harriet Thorpe
Cosette: Gina Beck, Celia Graham, Katie Hall, Lucie Jones, Camilla Kerslake, Myrra Malmberg, Dianne Pilkington (u/s)
Marius: Graham Bickley, Simon Bowman, Alistair Brammer, Glenn Carter, Martin Crewes, Hadley Fraser, Gareth Gates, Nick Jonas, Jon Lee, Tom Lowe, Adrian Lewis Morgan, Jon Robyns, Martin Smith, Hayden Tee, Steve Balsamo (u/s), Ramin Karimloo (u/s), Antony Hansen (u/s), Fra Fee (u/s)
Éponine: Sabrina Aloueche, Joanna Ampil, Samantha Barks, Meredith Braun, Shonagh Daly, Carrie Hope Fletcher, Linzi Hateley, Danielle Hope, Laura Michelle Kelly, Alexia Khadime, Eva Noblezada, Silvie Paladino, Siân Reeves, Lea Salonga, Caroline Sheen, Nancy Sullivan, Jenna Russell (u/s), Helen Owen (u/s)
Enjolras: Graham Bickley, Killian Donnelly, Bradley Jaden, Ramin Karimloo, Glyn Kerslake, Jamie Muscato, John Owen-Jones, David Thaxton, Oliver Thornton, Peter Polycarpou (u/s), Steve Balsamo (u/s), Tam Mutu (u/s), Fra Fee (u/s)
The Bishop of Digne: Simon Bowman, Earl Carpenter, David Thaxton (u/s)
Grantaire: Graham Bickley, Peter Polycarpou, John Owen-Jones (u/s)
Gavroche: Jonathan Bailey, James Buckley, James Byng, Chris Fountain, Daniel Huttlestone, Paul Keating, Robert Madge, Perry Millward, Adam Searles

Broadway (1987–2003)
Jean Valjean: Rob Evan, Dudu Fisher, Robert Marien, Gary Morris, John Cudia (u/s), Mike Eldred (u/s)
Javert: Anthony Crivello, Robert Cuccioli, Gregg Edelman, Shuler Hensley, Michael McCarthy, Chuck Wagner, Robert Westenberg, Stephen Bogardus (u/s), David Benoit (u/s), Robert Hunt (u/s), Wade Williams (u/s)
Fantine: Laurie Beechman, Donna Kane, Andrea McArdle, Maureen Moore, Rachel York, Debbie Gravitte, Catherine Hickland, Paige O'Hara, Melba Moore, Christy Baron, Alice Ripley, Lauren Kennedy, Jacquelyn Piro Donovan
Thénardier: Ed Dixon, Nick Wyman, Ann Crumb (u/s), Marla Schaffel (u/s), David Benoit (u/s)
Madame Thénardier: Betsy Joslyn, Olga Merediz (u/s), Jessica Molaskey (u/s)
Cosette: Jacquelyn Piro Donovan, Sarah Litzsinger (u/s), Megan Lawrence (u/s), Elena Shaddow (u/s), Jennifer Paz (u/s)
Marius: Chris Diamantopoulos, Eric Kunze, Peter Lockyer, Ricky Martin, Hugh Panaro, Matthew Porretta, Kevin Kern, Marcus Lovett (u/s), Hunter Foster (u/s), Max von Essen (u/s)
Éponine: Jessica Boevers, Catherine Brunell, Debbie Gibson, Diana Kaarina, Megan Lawrence, Lea Salonga, Natalie Toro, Sarah Uriarte Berry, Shanice, Kerry Butler, Sarah Litzsinger (u/s), Sutton Foster (u/s), Jennifer Paz (u/s)
Enjolras: Ron Bohmer, Gary Mauer, Kevin Earley (u/s), Darren Ritchie (u/s)
The Bishop of Digne: David Benoit
Grantaire: Wade Williams
Gavroche: Michael Shulman, Jarrod Spector, Jason Tam, Michael Zeidman, Grant Rosenmeyer, Harrison Chad, Nick Jonas, Lea Michele (u/s)

Broadway revival (2006–08)
Jean Valjean: John Owen-Jones, Drew Sarich, Ben Crawford (u/s), Jeff Kready (u/s)
Javert: Robert Hunt, Drew Sarich, Ben Crawford (u/s)
Fantine: Judy Kuhn, Lea Salonga, Desi Oakley (u/s)
Thénardier: Chip Zien
Madame Thénardier: Ann Harada
Éponine: Megan McGinnis
Enjolras: Max von Essen, Drew Sarich (u/s)

Broadway revival (2014–16)
Jean Valjean: Alfie Boe, John Owen-Jones, Kyle Jean-Baptiste (u/s)
Javert: Earl Carpenter, Hayden Tee
Fantine: Montego Glover, Erika Henningsen, Alison Luff, Melissa O'Neil (u/s)
Thénardier: Gavin Lee
Marius: Chris McCarrell
Éponine: Melissa O'Neil (u/s)
Enjolras: Jason Forbach

Concert casts

Productions

Sit-down productions

Original French production

Alain Boublil's initial idea to adapt Victor Hugo's novel into a musical came while at a performance of the musical Oliver! in London: 
As soon as the Artful Dodger came onstage, Gavroche came to mind. It was like a blow to the solar plexus. I started seeing all the characters of Victor Hugo's Les Misérables—Valjean, Javert, Gavroche, Cosette, Marius, and Éponine—in my mind's eye, laughing, crying, and singing onstage.

He shared the idea with French composer Claude-Michel Schönberg, and the two developed a rough synopsis and analysis of each character's mental and emotional state, as well as that of an audience. Schönberg then began work on the music, while Boublil the text. According to Boublil, "I could begin work on the words. This I did—after myself deciding on the subject and title of every song—in collaboration with my friend, poet Jean-Marc Natel." Two years later, a two-hour demo tape of Schönberg accompanying himself on the piano and singing every role was completed. An album of this collaboration was recorded at CTS Studios in Wembley and was released in 1980, selling 260,000 copies.

The concept album includes Maurice Barrier as Jean Valjean, Jacques Mercier as Javert, Rose Laurens as Fantine, Yvan Dautin as Thénardier, Marie-France Roussel as Mme. Thénardier, Richard Dewitte as Marius, Fabienne Guyon as Cosette, Marie-France Dufour as Éponine, Michel Sardou as Enjolras, Fabrice Bernard as Gavroche, Maryse Cédolin as Young Cosette, Claude-Michel Schönberg as Courfeyrac, Salvatore Adamo as Combeferre, Michel Delpech as Feuilly, Dominique Tirmont as M. Gillenormand, and Mireille as the hair buyer.

That year, in September 1980, a stage version directed by veteran French film director Robert Hossein was produced at the Palais des Sports in Paris. The show was a success, with 100 performances seen by over 500,000 people.

Most of the cast from the concept album performed in the production. The cast included Maurice Barrier as Valjean, Jean Vallée as Javert, Rose Laurens as Fantine, Maryse Cédolin and Sylvie Camacho and Priscilla Patron as Young Cosette, Marie-France Roussel as Mme. Thénardier, Yvan Dautin as M. Thénardier, Florence Davis and Fabrice Ploquin and Cyrille Dupont as Gavroche, Marianne Mille as Éponine, Gilles Buhlmann as Marius, Christian Ratellin as Enjolras, Fabienne Guyon as Cosette, René-Louis Baron as Combeferre, Dominique Tirmont as M. Gillenormand, Anne Forrez as Mlle. Gillenormand, and Claude Reva as the storyteller.

Original London production

The English-language version, with lyrics by Herbert Kretzmer and additional material by James Fenton, was substantially expanded and reworked from a literal translation by Siobhan Bracke of the original Paris version, in particular adding a prologue to tell Jean Valjean's background story. Kretzmer's lyrics are not a direct translation of the French, a term that Kretzmer refused to use. A third of the English lyrics were a rough translation, another third were adapted from the French lyrics and the final third consisted of new material. The majority is performed in recitative style; the vocalists use natural speech, not musical metrics.

The first production in English, produced by Cameron Mackintosh and adapted and directed by Trevor Nunn and John Caird, played to preview performances beginning on 28 September 1985 and formally opened on 8 October 1985 at the Barbican Centre, London. It was billed in the programme as "The Royal Shakespeare Company presentation of the RSC/Cameron Mackintosh production".

The set was designed by John Napier, costumes by Andreane Neofitou and lighting by David Hersey. Musical supervision and orchestrations were by John Cameron, who had been involved with the show since Boublil and Schönberg hired him to orchestrate the original French concept album. Musical staging was by Kate Flatt with musical direction by Martin Koch.

The original London cast included Colm Wilkinson as Jean Valjean, Roger Allam as Javert, Ken Caswell as the Bishop of Digne, Patti LuPone as Fantine, Zoë Hart, Justine McIntyre, Jayne O'Mahony and Joanne Woodcock as Young Cosette, Danielle Akers, Gillian Brander and Juliette Caton as Young Éponine, Susan Jane Tanner as Madame Thénardier, Alun Armstrong as Thénardier, Frances Ruffelle as Éponine, Rebecca Caine as Cosette, Michael Ball as Marius, David Burt as Enjolras, Clive Carter as Grantaire/Bamatabois, with Ian Tucker, Oliver Spencer and Liza Hayden sharing the role of Gavroche.

On 4 December 1985, the show transferred to the Palace Theatre, London and moved again on 3 April 2004, to the smaller Queen's Theatre, now called the Sondheim Theatre, with some revisions of staging.

The show celebrated its ten-thousandth performance on 5 January 2010, and its 30th anniversary in October 2015. The co-production has generated valuable income for the Royal Shakespeare Company.

The original show closed at the Queen's Theatre on 13 July 2019 to allow for theatre refurbishments, while a staged concert was performed at the adjacent Gielgud Theatre for a four-month run.

2019 updated staging
The updated staging developed for the 25th anniversary opened at the newly renamed Sondheim Theatre on 18 December 2019 in previews with opening night set for 16 January 2020. The new production is co-directed by James Powell and Laurence Connor with set and image design by Matt Kinley, lighting by Paule Constable, sound by Mick Potter and costumes by Andreane Neofitou and Christine Rowlands. The first cast for this new version included Jon Robyns (Valjean), Bradley Jaden (Javert), Carrie Hope Fletcher (Fantine), Shan Ako (Éponine), Lily Kerhoas (Cosette), Harry Apps (Marius), Gerard Carey (Thénardier), Josefina Gabrielle (Madame Thénardier) and Ashley Gilmour (Enjolras).

The show was forced to close temporarily from March 16, 2020, as a result of the COVID-19 pandemic. It was announced in June 2020 that it would not reopen until 2021. It reopened on 25 September 2021.

Original Broadway production
The musical opened as a pre-Broadway tryout at the Kennedy Center's Opera House in Washington, D.C., on 27 December 1986. It ran for eight weeks through 14 February 1987.

The musical then premiered on Broadway on 12 March 1987 at The Broadway Theatre. Colm Wilkinson and Frances Ruffelle reprised their roles from the London production. The $4.5 million production had a more than $4 million advance sale prior to its New York opening.

The show underwent further tightening, namely with improved sewer lighting and the incorporation of the Javert suicide scene effect. A New York Times report consisted of the following: "The transfer from London to the United States has prompted further modifications. 'We are taking this opportunity to rethink and perfect, to rewrite some details which probably no one else will see, but which for us are still long nights of work,' Mr. Boublil says. 'There are things that nobody had time to do in London, and here we have a wonderful opportunity to fix a few things. No one will notice, perhaps, but for us, it will make us so happy if we can better this show. We would like this to be the final version. Two songs were deleted—the complete version of Gavroche's song "Little People" and the adult Cosette's "I Saw Him Once". A short section at the beginning of "In My Life" replaced "I Saw Him Once". The lyrics in Javert's "Stars" were changed. It now ended with the line, "This I swear by the stars!", while the London production and cast recording ended with the repeated line, "Keeping watch in the night".

The original Broadway cast included Colm Wilkinson as Jean Valjean, David Bryant as Marius, Judy Kuhn as Cosette, Michael Maguire as Enjolras, Frances Ruffelle as Éponine, Braden Danner as Gavroche, Donna Vivino as Young Cosette, Jennifer Butt as Madame Thénardier, Leo Burmester as Thénardier, Randy Graff as Fantine, Terrence Mann as Javert, and Chrissie McDonald as Young Éponine.

Other members of the original Broadway cast included Anthony Crivello (Grantaire/Bamatabois), Kevin Marcum (Brujon), John Dewar (Joly), Paul Harman (Combeferre/Foreman), Joseph Kolinski (Feuilly), Alex Santoriello (Montparnasse/Labourer), Jesse Corti (Courfeyrac/Farmer), Susan Goodman (Old Woman/Innkeeper's Wife), John Norman (Prouvaire/Pimp), Norman Large (Bishop/Lesgles), Marcus Lovett (Babet/Constable), Cindy Benson (Old Woman), Steve Shocket (Claquesous/Fauchevelant/Constable/Pimp), Marcie Shaw, Jane Bodle, Joanna Glushak, Ann Crumb (Factory Girl), Kelli James, and Gretchen Kingsley-Weihe. Michael Hinton was the original drummer and credited on the cast album.

The musical ran at the Broadway Theatre through 10 October 1990, when it moved to the Imperial Theatre. It was scheduled to close on 15 March 2003, but the closing was postponed by a surge in public interest. According to an article in The Scotsman, "Sales picked up last October, when Sir Cameron made the announcement that the show would be closing on March 15th... its closure postponed to May 18th because of an unexpected increase in business." After 6,680 performances in sixteen years, when it closed on 18 May 2003, it was the second-longest-running Broadway musical after Cats. It was surpassed by The Phantom of the Opera in 2006.

This Broadway production of Les Misérables and its advertising in New York City is a recurring theme in American Psycho. The reviewer for the Financial Times wrote that Les Misérables is "the book's hilarious main cultural compass-point".

2006 Broadway revival
Only three years after the original run closed, Les Misérables began a return to Broadway on 9 November 2006 at the Broadhurst Theatre for a limited run that was subsequently made open-ended.

Using the set, costumes, performers, and other resources from the recently finished third US national touring production, the production was only slightly altered. Minor changes included colourful projections blended into its existing lighting design, and a proscenium that extended out into the first two boxes on either side of the stage.

Some cuts made to the show's prologue during its original Broadway run were restored, lyrics for Gavroche's death scene (known in the revival as "Ten Little Bullets") cut during the development of the original London production were restored, and much of the show was re-orchestrated by Christopher Jahnke, introducing a snare and timpani-heavy sound played by a 14-member band, a reduction of about 8 musicians from the original production's 22 musician orchestration.

The original 2006 Broadway revival cast included Alexander Gemignani as Jean Valjean, Norm Lewis as Javert, Daphne Rubin-Vega as Fantine, Celia Keenan-Bolger as Éponine, Aaron Lazar as Enjolras, Adam Jacobs as Marius, Ali Ewoldt as Cosette, Gary Beach as Thénardier, Jenny Galloway as Madame Thénardier, Drew Sarich as Grantaire, Brian D'Addario, Jacob Levine, Skye Rainforth and Austyn Myers as Gavroche, and Tess Adams, Kylie Liya Goldstein and Carly Rose Sonenclar as Young Cosette/Young Éponine.

Lea Salonga, who previously played the role of Éponine in the 10th Anniversary concert, replaced Rubin-Vega as Fantine beginning on 2 March 2007. Zach Rand replaced Jacob Levine as Gavroche on 15 March 2007. Ann Harada replaced Jenny Galloway as Mme. Thénardier on 24 April 2007. Ben Davis joined playing Javert, and Max von Essen playing Enjolras. Ben Crawford and Mandy Bruno joined the cast that day too, playing Brujon and Éponine respectively. On 29 June 2007, Chip Zien joined the cast as Monsieur Thénardier. On 23 July 2007, Sarich took over the role of Valjean, following Gemignani's departure. On 5 September 2007, it was announced that John Owen-Jones (who was playing Valjean in London) was to join the Broadway cast. In return, Sarich would join the London cast in Owen-Jones' place. Judy Kuhn, who originated the role of Cosette, returned to the show after twenty years as Fantine, succeeding Salonga.

The revival closed on 6 January 2008 after 17 previews and 463 performances.

2013 Toronto revival
A sit down production played at the Princess of Wales Theatre in Toronto, Canada based on the 25th Anniversary touring production. Previews began on 27 September 2013 with the opening night on 9 October. The production closed on 2 February 2014. Co-directed by Lawrence Connor and James Powell, Laurence Olivier Award nominee Ramin Karimloo starred as Jean Valjean; Colm Wilkinson, who originated the role, portrayed the Bishop of Digne in a one-day performance symbolic handing of the torch to Karimloo. He was joined by fellow West End star, Earl Carpenter, who reprised the role of Inspector Javert. Other cast members included Genevieve Leclerc as Fantine, Samantha Hill as Cosette, Melissa O'Neil as Éponine, Perry Sherman as Marius, Cliff Saunders as Monsieur Thénardier, Lisa Horner as Madame Thénardier, and Mark Uhre as Enjolras. The roles of young Cosette and young Éponine were shared by Ella Ballentine, Saara Chaudry and Madison Oldroyd. Gavroche was shared by David Gregory Black and Aiden GlennRead.

2014 Broadway revival
The show returned to Broadway in March 2014 at the Imperial Theatre with previews beginning 1 March 2014 and had an official opening on 23 March 2014. The creative team included the direction of Laurence Connor and James Powell, set design by Matt Kinley, costumes by Andreane Neofitou and Christine Rowlands, lighting by Paule Constable, sound by Mick Potter and projections by Fifty-Nine Productions. Cameron Mackintosh once again produced the show. On 22 October 2013, it was announced that Ramin Karimloo, Will Swenson, Caissie Levy, and Nikki M. James would be headlining the revival cast as Jean Valjean, Javert, Fantine, and Éponine respectively. Andy Mientus and Samantha Hill also starred as Marius and Cosette respectively. Angeli Negron and McKayla Twiggs share the role of Young Cosette. On 30 August 2015, Karimloo ended his run of the show and was replaced by Alfie Boe. After Boe's final performance on 28 February, the role of Valjean was played by John Owen-Jones beginning 1 March 2016 until the production closed on 4 September 2016, after 1,026 performances over two-and-a-half years. The revival recouped its entire initial investment and grossed $109 million.

The 2014 Broadway revival was nominated for 3 Tony Awards: Best Revival of a Musical, Best Leading Actor in a Musical for Karimloo, and Best Sound Design for Potter.

Touring productions

US national tours
The show had three national touring companies of the original Broadway production in the US, all of which shared the Broadway producer and manager, creative teams, as well nearly identical sets, costumes, and lighting. While the touring production and the New York production were running simultaneously, the staff, cast members, crew, and musicians of the two productions interchanged often, which contributed to keeping both companies of the show in form. When the New York production closed in 2003, the Third National Tour continued for another three years, and enjoyed the influx of many members from the original and subsequent New York companies.

The First National Tour opened at Boston's Shubert Theatre on 12 December 1987, and continued to play major cities until late 1991. The Second National Tour (called "The Fantine Company") opened at Los Angeles' Shubert Theatre on 1 June 1988. The production played for fourteen months then transferred to San Francisco's Curran Theatre where it enjoyed a similar run. The Third National Tour of Les Misérables (called "The Marius Company") was one of the longest running American touring musical productions. Opening on 28 November 1988, at the Tampa Bay Performing Arts Center in Florida, and closing on 23 July 2006, at the Fox Theatre in St. Louis, Missouri, the tour ran for seventeen years and 7,061 performances. The tour played in 145 cities in 43 states. The same touring company also frequently performed in Canada, made a 1994 diversion to Singapore, and another diversion in 2002 to be the first Western musical production to visit China, opening in Shanghai's Grand Theatre for a three-week engagement.

All US productions (including Broadway and its revival) were visually identical in scale and design but the third national tour was notable for its portability without sacrificing the Broadway-caliber experience. Thanks to innovative touring techniques borrowed from the pop/rock concert industry, the 4.5 million dollar production was adaptable to smaller and larger venues and traveled complete in all of 8 semi tractor trailers. It was set up and ready to go in less than 24 hours and broken down and packed up in about 16 hours. This allowed it to reach many cities and venues in its acclaimed, original Broadway form.

A new national tour began on 21 September 2017 at the Providence Performing Arts Centre (PPAC). It starred Nick Cartell as Valjean, Josh Davis as Javert, Melissa Mitchell as Fantine, J. Anthony Crane as Thénardier, Allison Guinn as Madame Thénardier, Joshua Grosso as Marius, Phoenix Best as Éponine, Matt Shingledecker as Enjolras and Jillian Butler as Cosette. The roles of young Cosette and Éponine were shared by Zoe Glick and Sophie Knapp, while the role of Gavroche was shared by Jordan Cole and Julian Lerner. It uses much of the staging and technical work of the 2014 Broadway revival.

Another tour launched on 7 October 2022 at the State Theatre, Cleveland, with Nick Cartell as Jean Valjean, Preston Truman Boyd as Javert, Haley Dortch as Fantine, Matt Crowle as Thénardier, Christina Rose Hall as Madame Thénardier, Addie Morales as Cosette, Gregory Lee Rodriguez as Marius, Christine Heesun Hwang as Eponine, Devin Archer as Enjolras, and Randy Jeter as Bishop of Digne.

UK and Ireland tours

1992–1993 tour
The first tour of the UK and Ireland opened at the Palace Theatre, Manchester 14 April 1992 with Jeff Leyton (Jean Valjean), Philip Quast (Javert, later replaced by Michael McCarthy) Ria Jones (Fantine), Meredith Braun (Éponine), Mike Sterling (Marius, later replaced by Richard Burman), Tony Timberlake (Thénardier), Louise Plowright (Mdme Thénardier), Sarah Ryan (Cosette) and Daniel Coll (Enjolras). The production then moved on to the Point Theatre, Dublin, Ireland, opening 30 June 1993, and then to Playhouse, Edinburgh, Scotland, opening 23 September 1993.

1997–2000 tour
In 1997 a second tour began at the Theatre Royal, Plymouth, running from 6 May until 14 June, the cast featured: Stig Rossen (Jean Valjean), Michael McCarthy (Javert), Julia Worsley (Fantine), Gemma Sandy (Éponine), Norman Bowman (Marius), Cameron Blakely (Thénardier), Cathy Breeze (Mdme Thénardier), Rebecca Vere (Cosette) and Mark O'Malley (Enjolras). The tour then continued as detailed in the table below:

25th anniversary tour 
A tour to commemorate the 25th anniversary of the show began performances on 12 December 2009, at the Wales Millennium Centre in Cardiff. Differences from the original production included a new set, new costumes, new direction and alterations to the original orchestrations. The tour also did not use a revolving stage and the scenery was inspired by the paintings of Victor Hugo. Locations have included Manchester, Norwich, Birmingham, and Edinburgh. The tour also played a special engagement in Paris. From September through October, the show returned to the Barbican Centre, London, site of the original 1985 production. The tour cast featured John Owen-Jones as Valjean, Earl Carpenter as Javert, Gareth Gates as Marius, Ashley Artus as Thénardier, Lynne Wilmot as Madame Thénardier, Madalena Alberto as Fantine, Rosalind James as Éponine, Jon Robyns as Enjolras, Katie Hall as Cosette (with Samara Clarke as Young Cosette), and David Lawrence as the Bishop of Digne. The tour ended on 2 October 2010, at the Barbican Theatre.

In the fall of 2010, the tour moved to the US with a new company presented by Broadway Across America to celebrate the 25th anniversary of the show opening on Broadway. The tour had its opening on 19 November 2010 at the Paper Mill Playhouse in Millburn, New Jersey, running until 19 December 2010. This tour originally starred Lawrence Clayton as Valjean, Andrew Varela as Javert, Betsy Morgan as Fantine, Jenny Latimer as Cosette, Justin Scott Brown as Marius, Chasten Harmon as Éponine, Michael Kostroff as Thénardier, Shawna Hamic as Madame Thénardier, Jeremy Hays as Enjolras, Josh Caggiano and Ethan Paul Khusidman as Gavroche, Maya Jade Frank, Faith Perez and Juliana Simone alternating as Young Cosette and Young Éponine. J. Mark McVey's daughter, Kylie McVey was the understudy for Young Cosette and Young Éponine. Clayton left the tour in April 2011. Ron Sharpe later took over as Valjean until June 2011. J. Mark McVey was then Valjean (McVey previously played the role on Broadway), but McVey and his daughter left the tour on 1 April 2012. Peter Lockyer replaces him as Valjean. Betsy Morgan left the tour on 2 December 2012. She was replaced by Genevieve Leclerc. The tour ran until 11 August 2013, closing at the Smith Center for the Performing Arts in Las Vegas. The tour's final cast included Peter Lockyer as Valjean, Andrew Varela as Javert, Genevieve Leclerc as Fantine, Lauren Wiley as Cosette, Devin Ilaw as Marius, Briana Carlson-Goodman as Éponine, Timothy Gulan as Thénardier, Shawna Hamic as Madame Thénardier, Jason Forbach as Enjolras, Ava Della Pietra and Erin Cearlock alternating as Little Cosette and Young Eponine, with Mia Sinclair Jenness as Little Girl, In 2011 it was reported that the tour is one of six US national Broadway tours that are grossing over $1,000,000 per week.

2018–present tour
A new UK and Ireland tour similar to the 25th anniversary production began at the Curve, Leicester on 3 November 2018, starring Killian Donnelly (Jean Valjean), Nic Greenshields (Javert), Katie Hall (Fantine), Tegan Bannister (Éponine), Bronwen Hanson (Cosette), Harry Apps (Marius), Martin Ball (Thénardier), Sophie-Louise Dann (Madame Thénardier) and Will Richardson (Enjolras).

After a hiatus due to the COVID-19 pandemic, the tour resumed performances on 23 November 2021 at the Theatre Royal, Glasgow.

2014 Australian tour
In mid 2013, a brand new Australian tour was announced, with Simon Gleeson as Valjean, Hayden Tee as Javert, Patrice Tipoki as Fantine, Trevor Ashley and Lara Mulcahy as the Thénardiers, Kerrie Anne Greenland as Éponine, Emily Langridge as Cosette, Euan Doidge as Marius and Chris Durling as Enjolras and Nicholas Cradock as Gavroche. The production premiered on 4 July at Her Majesty's Theatre, Melbourne. Additional stops for the Australian tour included the Crown Theatre in Perth, the Capitol Theatre in Sydney, and the Lyric Theatre QPAC in Brisbane. The Australian revival production transferred to Manila, Philippines in March 2016, becoming an international tour.

2016 International tour
On 16 September 2015, it was announced that the Australian tour would launch its international tour in Manila, Philippines at the Theatre at Solaire from March 2016 until 1 May 2016, and proceeded to the Esplanade Theatre in Singapore from May 2016. It then had its GCC premiere at the Dubai Opera in Dubai, United Arab Emirates from November 2016.

The Manila and Singapore productions featured Simon Gleeson as Valjean, Earl Carpenter as Javert, Helen Walsh as Madame Thénardier, Cameron Blakely as Thénardier, Kerrie Anne Greenland as Éponine, Emily Langridge as Cosette, Chris Durling as Enjolras, and Paul Wilkins as Marius. Rachelle Ann Go played the role of Fantine in the Manila production, and Patrice Tipoki returned the role in the Singapore production after her stint in the original London production. The Dubai production features John Owen-Jones as Valjean, Hayden Tee as Javert, Patrice Tipoki as Fantine, Peter Polycarpou as Thénardier, Jodie Prenger as Madame Thénardier, Carrie Hope Fletcher as Éponine, Alistair Brammer as Enjolras, Emily Langridge as Cosette, and Paul Wilkins as Marius.

Concert productions

10th Anniversary Concert

On 8 October 1995, the show celebrated the tenth anniversary of the West End production with a concert at the Royal Albert Hall. This 10th Anniversary Concert was nearly "complete", missing only a handful of scenes, including "The Death of Gavroche", "The Robbery" and the confrontation between Marius and the Thénardiers at the wedding feast. Sir Cameron Mackintosh hand-selected the cast, which became known as the Les Misérables Dream Cast, assembled from around the world, and engaged the Royal Philharmonic Orchestra. The concert concluded with seventeen Valjeans from various international productions singing, "Do You Hear the People Sing?" in their native languages. The concert cast included Colm Wilkinson as Jean Valjean, Philip Quast as Javert, Paul Monaghan as the Bishop of Digne, Ruthie Henshall as Fantine, Hannah Chick as Young Cosette, Jenny Galloway as Madame Thénardier, Alun Armstrong as Thénardier, Adam Searles as Gavroche, Michael Maguire as Enjolras, Michael Ball as Marius, Judy Kuhn as Cosette, Lea Salonga as Éponine, and Anthony Crivello as Grantaire. The concert was staged by Ken Caswell and conducted by David Charles Abell.

25th Anniversary Concert

The 25th Anniversary Concert of the West End production was held at The O2 in North Greenwich, South East London, United Kingdom, on Sunday, 3 October 2010 at 1:30 pm and 7:00 pm.

It featured Alfie Boe as Jean Valjean, Norm Lewis as Javert, Lea Salonga as Fantine, Nick Jonas as Marius, Katie Hall as Cosette, Jenny Galloway as Madame Thénardier, Ramin Karimloo as Enjolras, Samantha Barks as Éponine, Matt Lucas as Thénardier, Mia Jenkins as Young Cosette, Rob Madge as Gavroche, Hadley Fraser as Grantaire, Cameron Blakely as Bamatabois, and Earl Carpenter as the Bishop of Digne. Casts of the current London, international tour, original 1985 London, and several school productions took part, comprising an ensemble of three hundred performers and musicians. The concert was directed by Laurence Connor & James Powell and conducted by David Charles Abell.

The All-Star Staged Concert 

From 10 August to 2 December 2019, the musical was performed as a staged concert version at the Gielgud Theatre in the West End during the refurbishment of the adjacent Sondheim Theatre, where the original London production had been running and would be home to the new production from December 2019 onwards.

Featuring a cast and orchestra of over 65, the 16-week concert run starred Michael Ball as Javert, Alfie Boe as Jean Valjean, Carrie Hope Fletcher as Fantine, Matt Lucas and Katy Secombe as the Thénardiers, and John Owen-Jones played Jean Valjean for some performances during the run. Further leads included Rob Houchen (Marius), Bradley Jaden (Enjolras), Shan Ako (Éponine), and Lily Kerhoas (Cosette). Also featured were Simon Bowman playing the Bishop of Digne and Earl Carpenter playing Bamatabois and understudying Javert. Carpenter would later take over the role of the Bishop alongside Bamatabois.

The final concert was filmed and broadcast live to cinemas on 2 December and has since been released on home video and album, with a tour planned.

In October 2020, on the final of Britain's Got Talent, it was confirmed that the stage concert would return for a limited six-week run at the Sondheim Theatre from 5 December 2020 to 17 January 2021. It was subsequently extended twice and was due to play until 28 February 2021. Due to the COVID-19 pandemic, the audience were socially distanced and capacity was limited to 50%. Due to local COVID restrictions, the show was suspended from 16 December 2020 after just 10 performances, in which Boe had performed as Jean Valjean on eight occasions and Owen-Jones on two occasions. It reopened on 20 May 2021 and ran until 5 September. Ball, Boe, Fletcher, Lucas and Owen-Jones did not reprise their roles at reopening. The new cast featured Jon Robyns as Valjean, Jaden as Javert, Lucie Jones as Fantine, Gerard Carey and Josefina Gabrielle as the Thénardiers, Shan Ako as Éponine, Harry Apps as Marius, Jamie Muscato as Enjolras, Charlie Burn as Cosette, Carpenter as the Bishop of Digne and understudy Javert, Cameron Blakely as Bamatabois/Babet, and at certain performances Dean Chisnall playing the role of Valjean.

Other concert performances
The musical has also been performed in concert at Cardiff Castle and several venues in southern England, produced by Earl Carpenter Concerts. A concert version starring Jeff Leyton, Carmen Cusack, Annalene Beechey and Joanna Ampil was also performed at the Odyssey Arena, Belfast in 2001. In 1989, a one-night concert performance was performed at SkyDome, Toronto, and the largest concert production attracted an audience of approximately 125,000 as part of the Australia Day celebrations in Sydney's Domain Park. The Scandinavian concert tour, produced by Cameron Mackintosh in association with Noble Art, starred Danish musical icon Stig Rossen in the leading role and commemorated author Victor Hugo's 200th birthday. Venues on the tour included the Stockholm Globe Arena, Oslo Spektrum, the Helsinki Hartwell Areena, and the Gothenburg Scandinavium, with audiences totalling over 150,000 for the complete tour.

In November 2004, to celebrate the centennial of the Entente Cordiale, the Queen invited the cast of Les Misérables in the West End to perform for French President Jacques Chirac at Windsor Castle. It was the first time the cast of a West End musical had performed at a Royal residence. The part of Jean Valjean was played by Michael Ball – the original 1985 London and 1995 Dream Cast Marius – and the part of Javert was played by Michael McCarthy, Joanna Ampil as Fantine,  Gemma Wardle as Eponine, Julia Möller as Cosette, Gary Tushaw as Marius and Ramin Karimloo as Enjolras. The rest of the cast was the same as in the West End, supplemented by several guest singers and a choir of former performers.

In February 2008, Les Misérables was performed at the Bournemouth International Centre, England with a cast of West End stars accompanied by the Bournemouth Symphony Orchestra. In August 2008, a concert version, directed by Richard Jay-Alexander, was performed at the Hollywood Bowl. The cast included veteran Les Misérables star J. Mark McVey as Valjean, The Office star Melora Hardin as Fantine, Broadway star and Bowl veteran Brian Stokes Mitchell as Javert, Spring Awakening and Glee star Lea Michele as Éponine, Tony-winning Jersey Boys star John Lloyd Young as Marius, West End star Tom Lowe as Enjolras, Michael McCormick as Thénardier, Ruth Williamson as Madame Thénardier, Michele Maika as Cosette, Maddie Levy as Young Cosette, and Sage Ryan as Gavroche.

In September 2008, it was performed at the St John Loveridge Hall in Guernsey with a cast of West End performers—the first time that it had been professionally performed on the Island where Victor Hugo wrote the novel. Former London Valjean Phil Cavill reprised his role alongside veteran Michael McCarthy as Javert. In March 2009, the Guernsey production was remounted at Fort Regent in Jersey; and in July 2009, the musical was performed in concert at Osborne House on the Isle of Wight.

International productions
The show has been produced in forty-two countries and translated into twenty-one languages: English, French (re-translated from the English version),  German (Austria and Germany), Spanish (six versions: two from Spain, two from Mexico, one from Argentina, and one from Venezuela), Japanese, Hebrew, Hungarian, Icelandic, Norwegian (Bokmål and Nynorsk), Polish, Swedish (in Sweden and in Finland), Dutch (Netherlands and Belgium), Danish, Finnish, Brazilian Portuguese, Estonian, Czech, Mauritian Creole, Basque, Catalan and Korean. Including singles and promos, there have been over seventy official recordings from worldwide productions.

The first full West End / Broadway production in Europe (mainland) was set up in Oslo, Norway at Det Norske Teatret and opened on 17 March 1988. The production was in Norwegian and starred Norwegian singer/actor Øystein Wiik as Jean Valjean, Paul Åge Johannessen as Javert, Øivind Blunck as Thénardier, Kari Gjærum as Fantine, Amund Enger as Enjolras and Guri Schanke as Éponine. The first Oslo production was hugely successful and some 10% of Norway's entire population saw the show in the first 6 months. Øystein Wiik went on to also star as Jean Valjean in the productions in Vienna and London in 1989–1990.

The stage show, which had changed so significantly since its Parisian conception as a stadium concert in 1980, was translated back into the language of Victor Hugo for its French world première in Montreal, Quebec, Canada, in 1991. This production had a cast that presented five shows a week in French and three a week in English.

In 1998, a concert version in English was produced in Malta, at the Mediterranean Conference Centre, Valletta. This production was staged by a company called Act React and featured talents like Ray Mangion as Valjean, Roger Tirazona as Javert, Julie James as Fantine and Leila Ben Harris as Eponine.

North American productions
In September 2008, a mini-tour produced by Atlanta's Theater of the Stars played Eisenhower Hall at the United States Military Academy, in West Point, New York; the Filene Center at the Wolf Trap National Park for the Performing Arts in Vienna, Virginia; Kansas City Starlight Theatre; and the Fox Theater in Atlanta. The show featured a new set of original pictures painted by Victor Hugo himself. Robert Evan played Valjean, returning to the role he played in the mid-nineties on Broadway. Also featured were Nikki Rene Daniels as Fantine and Robert Hunt as Javert, both reprising their roles from the Broadway revival. Fred Hanson directed the production. The creative team included Matt Kinley as Scenic Designer, Ken Billington as Lighting Designer, Peter Fitzgerald and Erich Bechtel as Sound Designers, Zachary Borovay as Projection Designer, and Dan Riddle as musical director and Conductor.

In 2008, the Signature Theatre in Arlington, Virginia staged a small venue "black box" version of the play. Signature received Mackintosh's special permission for the production: "One of the great pleasures of being involved with the creation of Les Misérables is seeing this marvelous musical being done in a completely different and original way. Having seen many shows brilliantly reimagined at Signature I have no doubt that Eric and his team will come up with a revolutionary new take on Les Miz unlike anything anyone has seen before. Viva la différence!" The production officially opened on 14 December 2008 (after previews from 2 December), and ran through 22 February 2009 (extended from 25 January 2009).

A 2014 production at the Dallas Theater Center modernized the staging in a way rarely attempted in productions of this play, set visually in the modern-day United States rather than 1830s France. The concept was thought to be refreshing as a change from typical production styles and effective as a commentary on modern inequality. Though, much controversy surrounded their unauthorized depart from the authors' libretto and score.

In Panama, Les Misérables was staged in 2014 in Spanish at the famed National Theatre of Panama for a short, sold-out run, directed by Aaron Zebede.

School edition 
The school edition cuts a considerable amount of material from the original show. It is divided into thirty scenes and, although no critical scenes or songs have been removed, it runs 25–30 minutes shorter than the official version making the total running time about  hours. A few subtle changes of vocal pitch have been made: "What Have I Done?", Valjean's Soliloquy, "Stars" by Javert, "A Little Fall of Rain" by Éponine and Marius, "Turning", and "Castle on a Cloud" lose a verse each. During "Fantine's Arrest" Bamatabois loses two verses. The song "Fantine's Death/Confrontation" is edited, and the counterpoint duel between Javert and Valjean is lost, as well as a verse by Fantine. "Dog Eats Dog" by Thénardier is heavily truncated. "Beggars at the Feast", is shortened, with Thénardier losing a verse, and the song before it, "Wedding Chorale", is excluded entirely although the rest of the wedding remains in place. Also, the drinker's introduction to "Master of the House" is cut completely.

Film adaptation

Cast recordings

English
The following recordings of Les Misérables are available in English: the Original London Cast, the Original Broadway Cast, the Complete Symphonic Recording, the 10th Anniversary London Concert, The 25th Anniversary UK Tour Cast and The 25th Anniversary London Concert.

Original London Cast recording
The Original London Cast recording was the first English language album of the musical. Recorded in 1985, when the show premiered, it is closest to the original French concept album. For example, "Stars" appears before "Look Down" and shortly after, the original version of "Little People" plays, which was later incorporated into the revealing of Javert. It also features a song titled "I Saw Him Once", sung by Cosette, which was later incorporated into the first part of "In My Life". The album has sold 887,000 copies in the US.

Original Broadway Cast recording
The Original Broadway Cast recording was produced in 1987. It included several changes to the songs that are still evident in today's performances. As with its predecessor, it is incomplete, and leaves out songs or parts that are more important narratively than musically (e.g., "Fantine's Arrest", "The Runaway Cart", "The Final Battle"). The album has sold 1,596,000 copies in the US.

Complete Symphonic Recording
Recorded in 1988 and released in 1989, the Complete Symphonic Recording features the entire score. (The Czech Revival Recording is the only other album, in any language, to feature the entire score; on the other hand, the four 2003 Japanese recordings feature the entire score after the cuts first made on Broadway at the end of 2000.) Cameron Mackintosh's original plan was to use the Australian cast, but the scope was expanded to create an international cast featuring performers from the major performances of the musical. The cast was recorded in three different places.

The album, produced by David Caddick and conducted by Martin Koch, won the Best Musical Cast Show Album Grammy Award in 1990. The cast includes Gary Morris as Valjean, Philip Quast as Javert, Debra Byrne as Fantine, Gay Soper as Mme. Thénardier, Barry James as Thénardier, Kaho Shimada as Éponine, Ross McCall as Gavroche, Michael Ball as Marius, Anthony Warlow as Enjolras, Tracy Shayne as Cosette and Marissa Dunlop as Young Cosette.

10th Anniversary Concert

The 10th Anniversary recording was of a concert version of Les Misérables, performed at the Royal Albert Hall in October 1995, featuring full orchestra and choir. All parts were sung live, giving the performance a different mood from other recordings. The score was recorded consecutively without pauses or multiple recordings. The concert's encores are also included. As with the original recordings, however, they differed from the stage versions by excluding some songs (e.g., those vital to plot such as "Fantine's Arrest" and "The Runaway Cart" were kept, while unnecessary or complex songs, such as "At the Barricade", were left out).

25th Anniversary UK Tour Cast
Recorded live at the Palace Theatre in Manchester, this recording was released to commemorate 25 years of Les Misérables and features new arrangements and reinspired orchestrations.

25th Anniversary Concert

The 25th Anniversary Concert was recorded live at The O2 Arena on 3 October 2010 and is available on DVD in the UK while the Blu-ray was released worldwide. It was shown in select US theaters via NCM Fathom Events. The release for the DVD and Blu-ray in the United States was 22 February 2011 to promote the film adaptation.

Awards and nominations

Original West End production

Original Broadway production

2013 Toronto revival

2014 Broadway revival

2014 Australian revival

See also

 Les Misérables
 Les Misérables (British TV series)
 Lists of musicals
 Adaptations of Les Misérables

Notes

References

 Les Miserables Reviews Box Office Theatre Ltd. Retrieved 12 July 2016

Bibliography

External links

 
 
 
 An Archive of Performers from the Original Broadway Run of Les Misérables
 An Archive of Performers from the London Run of Les Misérables

Musicals by Claude-Michel Schönberg
1980 musicals
French musicals
Works based on Les Misérables
Plays set in the 19th century
Plays set in France
Broadway musicals
West End musicals
Musicals based on novels
Laurence Olivier Award-winning musicals
Sung-through musicals
Tony Award for Best Musical
Tony Award-winning musicals